Up the Dose may refer to:

Up the Dose (Skrape album), 2004
Up the Dose (Mentors album), 1986